Jean-Olivier Zirignon (born 27 April 1971 in Abidjan) is a Côte d'Ivoire (Ivory Coast) sprinter who specialized in the 100 metres. He finished seventh in 4 x 100 metres relay at the 1993 World Championships, together with teammates Ouattara Lagazane, Frank Waota and Ibrahim Meité.

On the individual level, Zirignon won a silver medal at the 1993 African Championships and a gold medal at the 1997 Jeux de la Francophonie, the latter in a personal best time of 10.07 seconds. This is the current national record.

References

External links

1971 births
Living people
Ivorian male sprinters
Athletes (track and field) at the 1992 Summer Olympics
Athletes (track and field) at the 1996 Summer Olympics
Olympic athletes of Ivory Coast
Sportspeople from Abidjan